Fuliiru (Furiiru, Kifuliiru, Fulero) is a Great Lakes Bantu language spoken by the Fuliiru people (Bafuliiru), also known as the Fuliru or Fulero, who live north and west of the town of Uvira in Uvira Territory, South Kivu province in the far eastern part of the Democratic Republic of the Congo. It is closely related to Kinyindu.

Phonology

Consonants
The table below gives the consonant set of Fuliiru.

Several sounds change when preceded by a nasal: voiceless sounds become voiced, and /β/ and /h/ are realized as [b].

The phoneme /n/ assimilates to the place of consonants that follow it: it can be realized as [m], [ɱ], [n], [ɲ], or [ŋ].

The phoneme /l/ is realized as [d] after /n/, as [ɾ] after the front vowels /e/ and /i/, and as [l] elsewhere. The phoneme /ɾ/ is likewise realized as [d] after /n/, but as [ɾ] elsewhere.

Vowels
The table below gives the vowel sounds of Fuliiru.

All five vowels occur in long and short forms, a distinction that is phonemically distinctive. The quality of a vowel is not affected by its length.

Tone
Like most Bantu languages, Fuliiru is tonal, with a two-way contrast between high and low tones. Morphemes can be underlyingly high (H), low (L), or toneless. Phonetically, high, low, mid, and falling tones can all occur; mid tones are the realization of an underlying LH sequence, and falling tones are the realization of an underlying HL sequence or an utterance-final H tone.

References 

Languages of the Democratic Republic of the Congo
Rwanda-Rundi languages